Maligrad (also Qytet i Vogël "small city"; , Mal Grad "small city/town") is an island situated deep within the Albanian part of Lake Prespa, with many caves suitable for wildlife and a circular
cliff. Shaped like a tadpole, it contains some trees and an area of sand. The island contains a famous Saint Mary Church, built by Kesar Novak (Qesar Novaku), a local noble, in 1369.
It has an area of almost 5 hectares.

See also
St. Mary's Church, Maligrad
Golem Grad

References

Lake islands of Albania
Geography of Korçë County
Prespa National Park (Albania)